Male Kompolje is a small settlement east of Muljava in the Municipality of Ivančna Gorica in central Slovenia. The area is part of the historical region of Lower Carniola and is now included in the Central Slovenia Statistical Region.

References

External links
Male Kompolje on Geopedia

Populated places in the Municipality of Ivančna Gorica